Gugjeh Qeya (also Romanized as Gūgjeh Qeyā and Gowgjeh Qīā; also known as Gholūcheh Qīā, Gogjeh Ghiya, Gowgcheh Qayeh, Gowgjeh Qayeh, Gucha-Kiya, Gūjeh Qayeh, Guoha Qiya, and Gūyjeh Qayah) is a village in Qoltuq Rural District, in the Central District of Zanjan County, Zanjan Province, Iran. At the 2006 census, its population was 919, in 229 families.

References 

Populated places in Zanjan County